is a Japanese professional footballer who plays as a defender for WE League club MyNavi Sendai Ladies.

Club career 
Sato made her WE League debut on 12 September 2021.

References

External links 

WE League players
Living people
1992 births
Japanese women's footballers
Women's association football defenders
Mynavi Vegalta Sendai Ladies players
Association football people from Ōita Prefecture